All About Anna is a 2005 Danish erotic film directed by Jessica Nilsson and starring Gry Bay and Mark Stevens. The film is explicit in its exploration of sexual relationships.

It is a co-production between Innocent Pictures and Lars von Trier's Zentropa Productions, and is the third of Zentropa's sex films for women, following Constance (1998) and Pink Prison (1999). All three films were based on the Puzzy Power Manifesto developed by Zentropa in 1997.

Plot 
Anna (Gry Bay) is a single woman who seeks to maintain an active sex life while staying clear of emotional involvement, after having been jilted by the love of her life, Johan (Mark Stevens). She has a relationship with Frank (Thomas Raft), but refuses to let him move in with her. When Johan shows up again after five years absence, she starts wondering how much longer she can maintain her emotional independence, and if that is what she wants. She has sex with him, loses his telephone number and cannot contact him. She ends her affair with Frank and when she is offered a job as costume designer in a French theatre, she decides to move to Paris. She leaves her flat to her flatmate Camilla (Eileen Daly) who asks her permission to rent out the now empty room to a friend of hers. This friend turns out to be Johan, and Anna meets him as she leaves for Paris, where the local stage actors Pierre (Morten Schelbech) and Sophie (Ovidie) offer new amorous temptations, but she worries about Johan finding a new love. In the end she returns to Copenhagen and, after mistakenly thinking that Johan has been unfaithful to her, she faces her fears of commitment and is reunited with him.

Release and distribution 
The film was originally released in November 2005 on a Scandinavian three-disc DVD. This was the first Danish pornographic film to be released with subtitles for the hearing-impaired, which was enthusiastically received by the deaf community.

The US theatrical premiere was held on 18 January 2007 in Chicago, where it was included in the series Cinematic Sexualities in the 21st Century, arranged by Doc Films in collaboration with The University of Chicago Film Studies Center.

The two-disc US DVD was released on January 29, 2008.

All About Anna was officially selected for Zurich Film Festival and Io Isabella International Film Week.

In September 2009, it was released theatrically in the United Kingdom as a double bill with Lars von Trier's Antichrist (also a Zentropa-produced film with sexually explicit images).

Reception and awards
In 2006 it was nominated for two EroticLine Awards in the categories Best International Newcomer (Gry Bay) and Best International Actor (Mark Stevens).

In 2007, it won three Scandinavian Adult Awards, including Best Scandinavian Couples Film, Best Scandinavian Actor (Thomas Raft) and Best Selling Scandinavian Star of 2006 (Gry Bay).

In September 2007, Germany's biggest weekly magazine Stern identified women's pornography as one of 50 trends, placed an image from All About Anna on the cover of its cultural supplement Stern Journal, and commented:

In her book Secrets of Porn Star Sex (Infinite Ideas, 2007), British author Marcelle Perks includes a chapter on female-friendly porn, in which she concludes: "Rather than being intimidated by porn, do a bit of research and find something that you can have fun with. An ideal introduction movie is the hit film All About Anna, a mainstream film that features real sex".

In April 2008, the U.S. trade journal AVN gave the film an AAAAA Editor's Choice Review. It was one of only four films to receive the journal's highest rating that month. Critic Jared Rutter wrote:

In May 2008, French trade journal Hot Vidéo #208 placed All About Anna highest in the category "la crème du porno feminine".

In May 2008, Danish lifestyle magazine Woman #112 had asked a group of female readers to rate a selection of erotic product, including books, websites, CDs etc. The highest score went to All About Anna.

In June 2008, the trade journal AVN Europe gave the film an 8 out of 10 rating, and wrote:

In November 2008, the film was nominated for four AVN Awards in the following categories:

 Best Foreign Feature
 Best Music Soundtrack
 Best Packaging
 Best On-Line Marketing Campaign – Individual Project (AllAboutAnna.com)

This among other things marked the first Best Foreign Feature AVN Award nomination for an Academy Award-nominated company.

In January 2009, All About Anna ranked number two on a top-ten of female-friendly sex films published on the Website of Europe's biggest newspaper, Bild. The list also included Constance and Pink Prison.

Release versions 
The film exists in at least three versions. The original Scandinavian DVD release contains both the Producer's Cut and the Director's Cut. A Softcore Version with no explicit sexual footage has also been released in Germany.

See also 
 List of mainstream films with unsimulated sex

Notes

References

External links 
 
 
 
 
 All About Anna review at Fleshbot
 All About Anna review at Adult Video News

2005 films
2005 drama films
2005 LGBT-related films
2000s English-language films
2000s erotic drama films
Danish erotic drama films
Danish LGBT-related films
English-language Danish films
LGBT-related drama films
Lesbian-related films
Zentropa films